Arababad-e Khosravi (also Romanized as  ‘Arabābād-e Khosravī) is a village in Arababad-e Afshar Rural District of the Central District of Chaharbagh County, Alborz province, Iran. At the 2006 census, its population was 1,832, in 466 families, at which time it was in Chahardangeh Rural District of Savojbolagh County, Tehran province. At the latest census in 2016, the village had a population of 1,869 in 647 households, by which time the county had become a part of the newly established Alborz province.

References 

Populated places in Alborz Province